Hans Hugo Harold Faltermeier (born 5 October 1952) is a German musician, composer and record producer.

Faltermeyer is best known for composing the "Axel F" theme for the feature film Beverly Hills Cop, an influential synth-pop hit in the 1980s. He also composed the "Top Gun Anthem" for the feature film Top Gun and the music for the Chevy Chase Fletch feature films, Fletch and Fletch Lives. The Beverly Hills Cop and Top Gun projects earned him two Grammy Awards: the first in 1986 for Best Album of original score written for a motion picture or television special, as a co-writer of the Beverly Hills Cop soundtrack; and the second in 1987 for Best Pop Instrumental Performance with guitarist Steve Stevens for "Top Gun Anthem" from the Top Gun soundtrack.

As a session musician, arranger and producer, Faltermeyer has worked with numerous international pop stars including Donna Summer, Amanda Lear, Patti LaBelle, Barbra Streisand, Glenn Frey, Blondie, Laura Branigan, La Toya Jackson, Billy Idol, Jennifer Rush, Bonnie Tyler and Pet Shop Boys.

Background
Faltermeyer was born in Munich, Federal Republic of Germany, the son of Anneliese (née Schmidt), a homemaker, and Hugo Faltermeier, a construction businessman. Encouraged by his parents (the owners of a civil engineering firm), he started playing piano at the age of six. At 11, a Nuremberg music professor discovered that Faltermeyer had absolute pitch. His boyhood years combined training in classical music with a developing interest in rock 'n roll. He played organ in a rock combo and studied trumpet and piano at the Munich music academy. While waiting to begin university studies he found work at a recording studio. Within three years he was engineering major classical sessions for the prestigious Deutsche Grammophon label. Then in 1978, Giorgio Moroder recognized his talent and brought him to Los Angeles to play keyboards and arrange the soundtrack for the film Midnight Express. Moroder and Faltermeyer continued their collaboration in the next decade, producing Donna Summer albums and several hits for various artists. Soon Faltermeyer was earning an international reputation for both precise workmanship and trendsetting creativity in his use of synthesizer technology.

Soundtrack work
Alongside a busy schedule as a record producer, he became increasingly involved in soundtrack work on Moroder's scores (Midnight Express, American Gigolo and Foxes) and was soon hired as composer in his own right—usually composing, performing and producing the complete score as well as a number of pop songs penned for various artists. Early on he created work for 1984's Thief of Hearts, with electronic scoring and songs for Melissa Manchester, Annabella Lwin, Elizabeth Daily and others. Then came his big break with the landmark hip hop / breakdance-influenced score for Beverly Hills Cop, featuring the worldwide hit, the "Axel F" theme (referred to by Faltermeyer himself as the "banana theme", as it was originally written for a specific scene where Detroit policeman Axel Foley gives a pair of Beverly Hills police officers the slip by shoving bananas up their exhaust pipe, causing their car to stall when they try and tail him).

The year after, the Fletch theme expanded on his trademark electronic soundscapes with experimental phase modulated percussion effects woven into the largely analog synth melodies. He also composed the theme song, "Bit by Bit", sung by Stephanie Mills.

The full scores of these films were not released on album. Only a handful of additional score tracks complemented these hits on vinyl: "The Discovery" and "Shoot-out" from Beverly Hills Cop and "Memories" from Top Gun, and only ever as B-sides on singles. However, The Running Man and Kuffs were graced with full score albums and the Thief of Hearts and Fletch scores also received reasonably good coverage on their respective soundtrack albums. In January 2007, La La Land Records finally released a limited edition soundtrack (3000 CD copies) for Tango & Cash. In December 2016, the same label issued albums of his work on the Beverly Hills Cop series.

In 1987, Faltermeyer recorded an album called Harold F with vocal tracks featuring various guest singers plus "Axel F" which appears as a bonus track. The song "Bad Guys" is based on the (otherwise unavailable) main theme for Beverly Hills Cop II.

In 1989, Faltermeyer composed soundtrack music on the Fletch sequel Fletch Lives.

In 1990, he co-produced the album Behaviour with Pet Shop Boys at his studio near Munich. The album was released later the same year.

Later career
In Vienna, Faltermeyer and Rainhard Fendrich collaborated on the 2002 musical Wake Up. Faltermeyer also provided the soundtrack for the 2007 computer game Two Worlds. He returned to film scoring for Kevin Smith's 2010 action comedy Cop Out starring Bruce Willis. Faltermeyer has his music featured in Top Gun sequel.

In May 2022 Faltermeyer published his autobiography Where's the Orchestra? My Story as an ebook to coincide with the release of Top Gun: Maverick.

Discography

Film scores

Albums

 As songwriter / producer / arranger / musician  / remixer
 Amanda Lear: I Am a Photograph (1977)
 Roberta Kelly: Gettin' the Spirit (1978)
 Dee D. Jackson: Cosmic Curves (1978)
 Giorgio Moroder and Chris Bennett: Love's in You, Love's in Me (1978)
 Giorgio Moroder: Battlestar Galactica (1978)
 Giorgio Moroder: E=mc2 (1979)
 Janis Ian: Night Rains (1979)
 Suzi Lane: Ooh La La (1979)
 The Sylvers: Disco Fever (1979)
 The Three Degrees: Three D (1979)
 Donna Summer: Bad Girls (1979)
 Donna Summer: The Wanderer (1980)
 Sparks: Terminal Jive (1980)
 Donna Summer: I'm a Rainbow (1981, shelved until 1996)
 Al Corley: Square Rooms (1984)
 Laura Branigan: Self Control (1984)
 Laura Branigan: Hold Me (1985)
 Richard T. Bear: The Runner (1985)
 E. G. Daily: Wild Child (1985)
 Billy Idol: Whiplash Smile (1986)
 Donna Summer: All Systems Go (1987)
 Jennifer Rush: Heart over Mind (1987)
 Jennifer Rush: Passion (1988)
 Chris Thompson: The Challenge (Face It) (1989)
 Franzisca: Hold the Dream (1990)
 Pet Shop Boys: Behaviour (1990)
 Dominoe: The Key (1990)
 Chris Thompson: Beat of Love (1991)
 Falco: "Jeanny (Remix)" (1991)
 Falco: "Emotional (Remix)" (1991)
 Chaya: Here's to Miracles (1993)
 Marshall & Alexander: Marshall & Alexander (1998)
 Bonnie Tyler: All in One Voice (1999)

Selected singles
 As songwriter / arranger / producer
 Camino De Lobo: "Carmen Disco Suite" (1983)
 Glenn Frey: "The Heat Is On" (1984)
 Patti LaBelle: "Stir It Up" (1984)
 Valerie Claire: "I'm a Model (Tonight's the Night)" (1984)
 Valerie Claire: "Shoot Me Gino" (1985)
 Marietta: "Fire and Ice" (1986)
 John Parr: "Restless Heart (Running Away with You)" (1988) (not available on the Running Man soundtrack album)
 Chris Thompson: "The Challenge (Face It)" (Wimbledon 1989 theme, 7" & CD including instrumental version)
 Artists United for Nature: "Yes We Can" (1989) (7" & CD including instrumental version)
 Kathy Joe Daylor: "With Every Beat of My Heart" (1990)

Solo albums
 Worldhits (1987) (Instrumental disco arrangements of various well-known songs)
 Harold F (1988)
 Harold Faltermeyer featuring Joe Pizzulo: "Olympic Dreams" (1992) (CD single)

Solo singles including instrumental themes

Collections
 Portrait of Harold Faltermeyer: His Greatest Hits (2003 double CD)

See also
 List of Billboard number-one dance club songs
 List of artists who reached number one on the U.S. Dance Club Songs chart
 List of German Academy Award winners and nominees
 List of Euro disco artists
 List of synthpop artists

References

Further reading
 Kuffs soundtrack, liner notes (unknown author), Milan 10151-2 (1992 CD).
 Tango & Cash soundtrack, liner notes by Randall D. Larson, La-La Land Records LLLCD 1052 (2006 CD).

External links
 
 
 

1952 births
German electronic musicians
German film score composers
German keyboardists
German male composers
German record producers
German session musicians
Grammy Award winners
Living people
Male film score composers
Musicians from Munich
Remixers
Video game composers
Varèse Sarabande Records artists
La-La Land Records artists